Manny Randazzo King Cakes is a bakery in Metairie, Louisiana in the United States. The bakery 
was founded in 1965 by Sam Randazzo and his three sons: Lawrence, Manuel and Anthony. The bakery specializes in king cakes. 

Randazzo King Cakes won best traditional king cake in the annual King Cake Snob competition, in 2017 and 2019. Their king cake has been named one of the best in New Orleans by The Times-Picayune/The New Orleans Advocate food critic Ian McNulty and one of the best in the country by Food & Wine. Randazzo King Cakes have been featured on Delish and Eater, on Fox 8 New Orleans, and in Southern Living.

Every year, US Congressman Steve Scalise buys and delivers Randazzo King Cakes to fellow congresspeople during Mardi Gras.

References

External links

"Manny Randazzo's King Cakes mark start of Carnival season" from WWL-FM

Bakeries of the United States
1965 establishments in Louisiana
Food and drink companies of New Orleans